Kalateh-ye Now Salmanabad (also Romanized as Kalāteh-ye Now Salmānābād; also known as Kalāteh) is a village in Tabas-e Masina Rural District, Gazik District, Darmian County, South Khorasan Province, Iran. At the 2006 census, its population was 32, in 8 families.

References 

Populated places in Darmian County